Georges Sadoul (4 February 1904 – 13 October 1967) was a French film critic, journalist and cinema writer. He is known for writing encyclopedias of film and filmmakers, many of which have been translated into English.

Biography 
Sadoul was born in Nancy.  He was trained at the Sorbonne and the IDHEC, a French cinema school. His father, Charles Sadoul, was a well-known ethnologist.

At the age of 19, a student in Nancy, he collaborated with L'Est Républicain and founded the Nancy-Paris Committee. The objective of this committee is to allow the population of Nancy to meet Parisian productions and artists. He notably brought there Jean Epstein, Henry Prunières, André Lurçat, Jacques Rivière, Jacques Copeau and André Lhote.

Once a surrealist, he became a member of the French Communist Party in 1932. He is editor-in-chief of the magazine for young people, published by the PCF, Mon Camarade. He was responsible for the cinematographic section of the journal Regards, from 1936. Until the war, he published articles regularly in L'Humanité and the Cahiers du bolchévisme.

In his Diary of war, he recounts at length his phoney war and the debacle of 1940.

Sadoul was also a member of the Resistance, alongside Louis Aragon, and responsible for the Front National des Intellectuels for the southern zone from 1941 to 1944. He collaborated with the clandestine Les Letters Françaises and the Stars.

After the Second World War he published in six volumes his main work General History of Cinema ("Histoire générale du cinéma"). He viewd films around the world with a focus on developing countries. Throughout his career, Sadoul was accused of having an ideological bias in his works.

He was the first secretary general of the French Federation of Film Clubs and the International Federation of Film Clubs. He published of some of the most important reviews of the era in magazines such as Cahiers du Cinéma.
He died in Paris at the age of sixty-three.

Bibliography
Histoire générale du cinéma. Tome 1. L'invention du cinéma (1832–1897), Denoël, 1946 
Histoire générale du cinéma. Tome 2. Les pionniers du cinéma, Denoël, 1950–1975 
Histoire générale du cinéma. Tome 3. Le cinéma devient un art – L'avant-guerre, Denoël, 1950–1975 
Histoire générale du cinéma. Tome 4. Le cinéma devient un art – La première guerre mondiale, Denoël, 1950–1975 
Histoire générale du cinéma. Tome 5. L'Art muet – L'après-guerre en Europe, Denoël, 1950–1975 
Histoire générale du cinéma. Tome 6. L'Art muet – Hollywood – La fin du muet, Denoël, 1950–1975
Histoire générale du cinéma. Tome 6 (according to the initial outline). L'époque contemporaine (1939-1954) – 1/Le cinéma pendant la guerre (1939–1945), Denoël, 1946, rééd. 1954 
Dictionnaire du cinéma, 1965 
Dictionnaire des cinéastes, 1965 
Histoire de l'art du cinéma, 3e édition, Flammarion, 1949 
le Cinéma français, Flammarion, 1962 
Histoire du cinéma mondial, des origines à nos jours, Flammarion, 1949

References

External links
 Partial biography (in French)

1904 births
1967 deaths
University of Paris alumni
French male non-fiction writers
Communist members of the French Resistance
20th-century French journalists
20th-century French male writers